The Violent Heart is a 2020 American drama film written and directed by Kerem Sanga. It stars Jovan Adepo, Grace Van Patten, Lukas Haas, Kimberly Williams-Paisley, Cress Williams, Jahi Di'Allo Winston, and Mary J. Blige.

It had its world premiere at the Deauville Film Festival on September 9, 2020. It was released on February 19, 2021, by Gravitas Ventures.

Plot

Fifteen years after the mysterious murder of his big sister Wendy, Daniel is striving to become a mechanical engineer for the marines. Since he witnessed the murder of his sister; he tries to juggle the life that he wants for the awful memories that he has left behind. In the midst of all of this he meets Cassie; a witty and loquacious young girl that attends a local high school when he has to stop by the auto shop at her dad's request for an oil change. Having to leave the car behind she asks Daniel to take her back to the high school that his brothers attend. Cassie tells Daniel about her father; he expressed that she must really love her father because of how she speaks about him in such a high standard. She soon finds out that him and another teacher at the school are having an affair. This causes her opinion to change and she starts to interact with Daniel a little more. Where Cassie figures out their past have a lot of connections that will soon surface.

Cast

In addition, Jordan Preston Carter briefly appears as the young Daniel who witnesses his sister's murder.

Production
In December 2017, Grace Van Patten and Jovan Adepo joined the cast of the film, with Kerem Sanga directing from a screenplay he wrote, with Shawn Levy, Dan Cohen, Ed McDonnell and Tobey Maguire, who will serve as producers under their 21 Laps Entertainment, 3311 Productions and Material Pictures banners, respectively. In January 2019, Mary J. Blige, Lukas Haas, Jahi Di'Allo Winston and Kimberly Williams-Paisley joined the cast of the film. In February 2019, Cress Williams joined the cast of the film.

Filming
Principal photography began in February 2019.

Release
It had its world premiere at the Deauville Film Festival on September 9, 2020. It was originally set to have its world premiere at the Tribeca Film Festival in April 2020, however, the festival was cancelled due to the COVID-19 pandemic. In December 2020, Gravitas Ventures acquired distribution rights to the film, and set it for a February 19, 2021, release.

Reception
On Metacritic, the film holds a rating of 49 out of 100, based on 9 critics, indicating "mixed or average reviews".

References

External links
 
 
 

Films postponed due to the COVID-19 pandemic
American drama films
Films shot in Texas
21 Laps Entertainment films
Films produced by Tobey Maguire
2020 films
2020 drama films
2020s English-language films
2020s American films